Asterophrys pullifer is a species of frog in the family Microhylidae.

References

pullifer
Endemic fauna of New Guinea
Amphibians of Papua New Guinea
Amphibians of Western New Guinea
Amphibians described in 2006
Taxa named by Rainer Günther